Herrnhut  (Sorbian: Ochranow) is an Upper Lusatian town in the Görlitz district in Saxony, Germany, known for the community of the Moravian Church established by Nicolas Ludwig, Count von Zinzendorf in 1722.

Geography
It is located in the historic Upper Lusatia region, on the road Bundesstraße 178, and on the Zittau–Löbau railway line.

The municipality borders on, among other municipalities, Oderwitz.

Subdivisions
Herrnhut is also the name of the largest town in the municipality. Since 1 January 2013, when Berthelsdorf was incorporated, the municipal area contains 11 subdivisions:
 Herrnhut (original town)
 Ninive
 Ruppersdorf
 Schwan
 Friedensthal
 Strahwalde
 Euldorf
 Großhennersdorf
 Heuscheune
 Neundorf auf dem Eigen
 Schönbrunn
 Berthelsdorf
 Rennersdorf/O.L.

History

Herrnhut proper was founded in the early 18th century by German-speaking religious refugees of Bohemian Brethren from Margraviate of Moravia. The Unity of the Brethren arose after the reformer Jan Hus had been burnt at the stake during the Council of Constance in 1415. In the 18th century, they had to face the stern Counter-Reformation measures enacted in the Lands of the Bohemian Crown by the Habsburg rulers. From 1722 refugees came to Upper Lusatia, held by the Electors of Saxony since the Peace of Prague (1635). After meeting with their leader Christian David, a Moravian missionary, the German nobleman Count Nikolaus Ludwig von Zinzendorf (1700–1760) invited them to settle on his extended Berthelsdorf estates.

Shortly afterwards, David built the first home in what was to become Herrnhut. Herrn Hut means the Lord's watchful care or the Lord's protection. Zinzendorf himself had a new residence erected here in 1725–1727). From Herrnhut the community spread to Rixdorf near Berlin, the former Marienborn monastery near Büdingen, to Herrnhaag, to Norden, to Pawlowitzke (1771–1772). Numerous daughter churches arose all over the world. The first organized Protestant missionary movement began from Herrnhut in 1732, when 2 Brethren went to the Danish West Indies, and then others went also to Greenland. The first North American mission work began in Savannah, Georgia in 1735. In 1738, the missionary station of Genadendal was founded in South Africa. Christiansfeld in Denmark followed in 1771.

Herrnhut holds a prominent place in the history of Protestantism, as well as the broader history of Christianity. Zinzendorf's community influenced John Wesley in creating Methodism and it contributed to the rise of Evangelicalism, a broad interdenominational movement of more than 300 million people all over the globe.

Population

According to the Saxon state congress in 1777, Herrnhut contained 76 homes.

In the mid-19th century the population rose above 1,000, and after World War II it reached more than 2,000. Since the 1950s there has been a decline in population, which was compensated for by the incorporation of neighboring municipalities.

Location maps

Coat of arms
The Herrnhut coat of arms is blue and white, showing the tower of the Altan (the lookout tower) atop the Hutberg hill above the city. The name of Hutberg hill ("Hill of Watching") suggested the name of the Moravian settlement founded by these exiles on the Zinzendorf estate in 1722. Herrn Hut means "the Lord's Watchful care".

Culture
Herrnhut has a church and two museums, including a museum of local history. It is the center of the worldwide Moravian Church, the Unitas Fratrum, in German Brüder-Unität or Brüdergemeine. Many European languages have named the Moravian Church movement directly after Herrnhut, for example hernhuutlus in Estonian, herrnhutilaisuus in Finnish, hernhūtieši in Latvian and herrnhutismen in both Norwegian and Swedish.

The former Herrnhut train station on the decommissioned railway line Zittau–Löbau has been turned into an art gallery.

Economy
Its economy is based on church administration, education, tourism and manufacturing, including a 25-pointed star that is often hung in windows and on porches during the Christmas season, which has been produced for over 150 years. It is called the Moravian star or Moravian Advent star (Herrnhuter Adventsstern). From Herrnhut, the Moravian star decoration has spread across Europe and America.

Gallery

Notable people

 Christian Renatus von Zinzendorf (1727–1752), church writer
 Heinrich August Jäschke (1817–1883), missionary, linguist and orientalist
 Adolf Heinrich Lier (1826–1882), landscape painter
 Hugo Theodor Christoph (1831–1894), entomologist
 Herbert Fischer (1914–2006), Ambassador of the GDR to India
 Martin Clemens (born 1939), Saxon politician (CDU) and former deputy of the Saxon Landtag
 David Gill (civil servant) (born 1966), Chief of the Federal Presidential Office under Joachim Gauck

References

External links

Herrnhuter Sterne
Evangelische Brüder 

 
Towns in Görlitz (district)
History of the Moravian Church
Settlements of the Moravian Church
Populated places established in 1722